William Muirhead (April 4, 1819 – December 29, 1884) was a merchant, shipbuilder and political figure in New Brunswick, Canada. He served in the Legislative Council of New Brunswick from 1867 to 1873. In 1873, Muirhead was named to the Senate of Canada for Chatham division as a Liberal and served until his death in 1884.

He was born in Pictou, Nova Scotia, the son of John Muirhead, a Scottish immigrant, and was educated at Miramichi, New Brunswick. He settled in Chatham and married Annie Gray. Muirhead was involved in shipping goods, owning his own ships and mills. He was president of the Miramichi Shipbuilding Company and of the Miramichi Warehousing and Dock Company. He was also a director of the Maritime Bank of the Dominion and of the Northern Western Railway.

References 
 
The Canadian parliamentary companion and annual register, 1877, CH Mackintosh

1819 births
1884 deaths
Canadian senators from New Brunswick
Canadian people of Scottish descent
Liberal Party of Canada senators
New Brunswick Liberal Association MLCs